Muhammad Ibrahim Sanya (born 21 July 1956) is a Tanzanian CUF politician and Member of Parliament for Mji Mkongwe constituency since 2010.

References

1956 births
Living people
Civic United Front MPs
Tanzanian MPs 1995–2000
Tanzanian MPs 2000–2005
Tanzanian MPs 2005–2010
Tanzanian MPs 2010–2015
Kiponda Secondary School alumni
Tanzanian politicians of Indian descent
Zanzibari politicians